Mastraggelis was the brand name of the company founded by the Mastraggelis Brothers in Aigaleo (Athens), Greece. Mastraggelis became mostly known for their production of bus bodies, as well as other metal structures, but it also produced complete vehicles (three-wheeled trucks) between 1968 and 1974. The trucks, not particularly successful compared to other Greek three wheelers, could be distinguished by their characteristic cab design.

References/External links 
L.S. Skartsis and G.A. Avramidis, "Made in Greece", Typorama, Patras, Greece (2003)  (republished by the University of Patras Science Park, 2007) 
Mastraggelis in Dutch Auto Catalog

Defunct motor vehicle manufacturers of Greece
Three-wheeled motor vehicles